Maschalandra is a monotypic snout moth genus described by Edward Meyrick in 1937. Its only species, Maschalandra euphema, described in the same publication, is known from Democratic Republic of the Congo (including Lubumbashi, the type location).

References

Moths described in 1937
Pyralinae
Monotypic moth genera
Moths of Africa
Pyralidae genera